Four vessels of Britain's Royal Navy have borne the name HMS Anacreon, named after the Greek poet Anacreon.

 was the French privateer Anacreon, which  captured in 1799. She was sold in 1802. 
HMS  was the mercantile Anacreon launched at Sunderland in 1800 that the Navy acquired in 1804 for use as a defense ship of 16 guns. The Navy returned her to her owners in 1805, and she was wrecked in 1823. 
 was a  launched in 1813 and lost, presumed foundered with all hands, in February 1814 while en route from Lisbon.
 was a schooner launched in 1815 and transferred to Customs the following year.

Royal Navy ship names